Adam Lyth (born 25 September 1987) is an English Test cricketer, who has played for Yorkshire County Cricket Club since 2007. He is a left-handed opening batsman.

Career

Domestic career

Born 25 September 1987, Whitby, North Yorkshire, Lyth made his first-team debut for Yorkshire in a Pro40 match in 2006, and his first-class debut in May 2007, against Loughborough UCCE. He was with the England Under-16 squad to South Africa, and the England U-19 squad to Malaysia and India, and home against Pakistan. 

In the 2008 season, Lyth scored 645 runs in the County Championship, won the Yorkshire County Cricket Club Young Player of the Year award, and signed a three-year contract with Yorkshire at the end of the season. 

On 24 August 2010, Lyth was awarded his county cap on his home ground at North Marine Road Ground, Scarborough, before the start of Yorkshire's County Championship match against Hampshire.

At the County Championship match against Leicestershire at Grace Road in July 2012, Lyth created a county record, by becoming the first Yorkshire batsman to score over 200 runs, whilst carrying his bat through an entire innings. He also totalled a first-class career best of 248 not out. In 2014 Lyth enjoyed his finest year, scoring 1489 Championship runs, including six centuries, at an average of 67.68.

On 17 August 2017, Lyth scored the highest ever individual score in the T20 Blast. He scored 161 from 73 deliveries, which consisted of 20 fours and 7 sixes, against Northamptonshire. He built an opening partnership of 127 runs with Tom Kohler-Cadmore. Yorkshire won by 124 runs.

Lyth has also become an increasingly useful bowler in the T20 format and took a career best 5 for 31 against Nottinghamshire Outlaws in the 2019 T20 Blast and in the process recorded the best ever T20 bowling figures at Trent Bridge.

In the 2020 PSL Playoffs, Adam Lyth was named replacement for the West Indian player Fabian Allen. He was signed by Northern Superchargers for The Hundred 2021 tournament. In April 2022, he was bought by the Northern Superchargers for the 2022 season of The Hundred.

International career
In March 2015, Lyth was named in the England Test squad for the tour of the West Indies, but did not play in the series, with Jonathan Trott being preferred instead.

Lyth made his Test debut for England against New Zealand in May 2015 and scored his first Test run off the first ball of the game. He failed to make a significant score in either innings, being dismissed for just seven in the first innings and then losing his wicket while on 12 in the second. Despite this, England went on to win the game by 124 runs to go 1–0 up in the series. In the second Test, Lyth top scored for England with 107, helping them to post 350. However, he could not follow this up in the second innings, being dismissed for 24 as England lost the game by 199 runs to draw the series 1–1.

Lyth was selected as England's opener for the 2015 Ashes series. Lyth was subsequently dropped from the Test side after the Ashes series after gaining a total of 111 runs from 9 innings.

Outside cricket
Lyth's brother Ashley was also a cricketer and footballer, representing Yorkshire 2nds at cricket and making over 100 appearances for Scarborough. A broken leg put paid to a career with Leicester City. Lyth himself also had football trials as a youngster, with Manchester City.

Lyth played football at semi professional level for Whitby Town F.C. in the Northern Premier League. His only appearance was coming on as a substitute against Runcorn in 2006 in a 4–0 victory.

References

External links

1987 births
Living people
People from Whitby
English cricketers
England Test cricketers
Yorkshire cricketers
Marylebone Cricket Club cricketers
Sportspeople from North Yorkshire
Wisden Cricketers of the Year
Rangpur Riders cricketers
Northern Superchargers cricketers